A by-election was held for the New South Wales Legislative Assembly electorate of Woollahra on 26 June 1937 because of the death of Sir Daniel Levy.

Dates

Result

The by-election was caused by the death of Sir Daniel Levy.

Aftermath
Harold Mason did not serve long, retiring at the general election on 26 March 1938.

See also
Electoral results for the district of Woollahra
List of New South Wales state by-elections

References

1937 elections in Australia
New South Wales state by-elections
1930s in New South Wales